Cispinilus is a monotypic genus of Central African nursery web spiders containing the single species, Cispinilus flavidus. It was first described by Carl Friedrich Roewer in 1955, and is only found in Africa.

See also
 List of Pisauridae species

References

Monotypic Araneomorphae genera
Pisauridae
Spiders of Africa
Taxa named by Carl Friedrich Roewer